The Copa del Rey de Balonmano 2014–15 was the 40th edition of this tournament, organized by Liga ASOBAL. The tournament began on October 4 and 5 with the matches of the first round.

FC Barcelona won its nineteenth Copa del Rey title after defeating BM Granollers 27–26 in the Final. Further, with this win, FC Barcelona achieved a 2014–15 season trophy record (7), winning every trophy which they played: Liga ASOBAL, Copa del Rey, Copa ASOBAL, Supercopa ASOBAL, EHF Champions League, Superglobe and the Supercopa de Catalunya.

Competition format

Knockout stage
First round (single match)
Second round (single match)
Round of 16 (single match)
Quarter-final (two legs)

Final four
Semifinals (single match)
Final (single match)

Calendar

First round
Matches were played on 4 and 5 October 2014.

All times are CEST.

|}

Matches

Second round
Matches were played on 22 October 2014.

All times are CET.

|}

Matches

Round of 16
The draw was conducted on 24 October 2014. Matches were to be played on 5 November.

|}

Matches

Quarter finals
The quarter final's draw was conducted on 20 December during ASOBAL's general meeting in León. This round was due to play over two legs. The matches were scheduled for 4 February 2015 (1st leg) and 1 April (2nd leg).

All times are CET.

|}

Matches

First leg

Second leg

Final four
The Final Four was played during days 6 and 7 June at Palacio de Deportes in Gijón, Asturias. The draw was conducted on May 14. One place to the 2015–16 EHF Cup was given to the champion. As FC Barcelona and Fraikin Granollers qualified to European competitions through the 2014–15 Liga ASOBAL, Juanfersa Gijón and Ángel Ximénez Puente Genil can qualify if they at least win the semifinals. If both teams lose their match, the fifth qualified in Liga ASOBAL would play EHF Cup.

Semifinals

Final

See also
Liga ASOBAL 2014–15

References

External links
Copa del Rey at ASOBAL.es
Copa del Rey at RFEBM.net

2014-15
2014–15 in Spanish handball